Islam Khuseinovich Yashuev (born 23 January 1993) is a Russian judoka. He competes in the -60 kg weight category and won a gold medal in the 2018 European Championships.

References

External links
 
 

1993 births
Russian male judoka
Living people